Jeremiah Stevenson Louis (born 12 March 1996) is a Kittitian cricketer who has played for the Leeward Islands in West Indian domestic cricket.

Louis made his senior debut for the Leewards during the 2014–15 Regional Four Day Competition, against Trinidad and Tobago. A right-arm medium-fast bowler, his List A debut came later in the season, against Jamaica. Louis's best bowling performance to date came in a four-day game against the Windward Islands, when he took 3/29.

In the player draft for the 2017 CPL, Louis was selected by the St Kitts & Nevis Patriots.

In November 2017, he took his maiden five-wicket haul in first-class cricket, bowling for the Leeward Islands against Barbados in the 2017–18 Regional Four Day Competition.

In June 2018, he was named in the Cricket West Indies B Team squad for the inaugural edition of the Global T20 Canada tournament.

References

External links
Player profile and statistics at CricketArchive
Player profile and statistics at ESPNcricinfo

1996 births
Living people
Kittitian cricketers
Leeward Islands cricketers
St Kitts and Nevis Patriots cricketers